Panzer Elite Action: Dunes of War is an arcade shooter real-time strategy simulation game that was developed by ZootFly. The game was published by JoWooD Entertainment in European Union, and by GFI and Russobit-M in Russia. The game was published by DreamCatcher Interactive in North America.

Gameplay
Panzer Elite Action: Dunes of War is the African chapter to Panzer Elite Action: Fields of Glory. Panzer Elite Action: Dunes of War sends the player into the desert, leading a tank squad during the battles of the African World War II campaign.

The game features 6 new levels in two campaigns, including Germans and Allies, 10 new multiplayer maps with different environments and styles and Conquest and Capture the Flag multiplayer mode for up to 32 players.

References

External links
Official site

Panzer Elite
2007 video games
Action video games
DreamCatcher Interactive games
JoWooD Entertainment games
Real-time strategy video games
Tank simulation video games
Video games developed in Slovenia
Windows games
Windows-only games
World War II video games
Multiplayer and single-player video games
Russobit-M games